Skarddalseggi or Skardalseggje is a mountain in Lom Municipality in Innlandet county, Norway. The mountain is surrounded by several other notable mountains including Storådalshøi to the east; Store Rauddalseggi to the south; Skarddalstinden to the west; Austre Høgvagltinden and Høgvagltindene to the northwest; Kyrkja, Kyrkjeoksli, Langvasshøi, and Visbretinden to the north; and Urdadalstindene and Semeltinden to the northeast.

See also
List of mountains of Norway by height

References

Jotunheimen
Lom, Norway
Mountains of Innlandet